Luisa Eugenia Navas Bustamante (27 July 1920 – 18 November 2020) was a Chilean pharmacist and botanist.

Life 

On 9 May 1951 she received a degree in chemistry and pharmacy. That same year she became Assistant Chair of Botany in the School of Chemistry and Pharmacy of the University of Chile. In 1958 she was “Professor extraordinarius”, and assistant of Hugo Gunckel in the Instituto Pedagógico in the section of the cryptogamic plants and finally chair Professor in the Faculty Chemical and Pharmaceutical Sciences the 1985. She studied seaweed, she concurred with his father to the Marine Biology Station at Montemar. With authorization of the Dean of Pharmacy, she went twice a week National Museum of Natural History of Santiago. On behalf of Humberto Fuenzalida, she reorganized the Botanical section for Cryptogamy. With a scholarship of UNESCO she studied plant ecology in Mexico, in the Polytechnical School with specialists of Montpellier and of the San Luis of Potosí. Later she concurs to the botanical Garden of the Central University of Caracas.

Taxa described by L.E.Navas

 Gavilea longibracteata (Lindl.) Sparre ex L.E.Navas
 Dioscorea humifusa var.gracilis (H. et A.) L.E.Navas
 Myrceugenia colchaguensis (Phil.) L.E.Navas
 Parietaria fernandeziana (Steud.) L.E.Navas
Urtica trichantha (Wedd.) Acevedo et L.E.Navas

External links 
Flora de la cuenca de Santiago de Chile Tomo I
 Tomo II
Tomo III

Notes and references 

20th-century Chilean botanists
Chilean women botanists
Chilean women scientists
20th-century women scientists

1920 births
2020 deaths

Chilean centenarians

Women centenarians